Clover Creek (previously East Fork Bruneau River) is a  long tributary of the Bruneau River in the U.S. state of Idaho.

See also
List of rivers of Idaho
List of longest streams of Idaho

References

Rivers of Owyhee County, Idaho
Rivers of Idaho